Eugene Christopher O'Donnell (28 November 1913 - 16 August 1982) was a member of the Queensland Legislative Assembly.

Biography
O'Donnell was born in Bathurst, New South Wales, the son of Michael Patrick O'Donnell and his wife Mary (née Scanlon). He was educated at St Laurence's College in Brisbane before attending the Brisbane Teachers College. He was then posted to various schools around southern and central Queensland as a teacher and school principal.

On The 10th Aug 1936 O'Donnell married Emily Conlon and together had a son and a daughter. He died in Brisbane in August 1982 and was cremated at the Mt Thompson Crematorium.

Public career
O'Donnell won the 1961 by-election for the seat of Barcoo in the Queensland Legislative Assembly to replace Ned Davis, who had died in April of that year. He represented the electorate until 1972 when Barcoo was abolished. He then won the re-established seat of Belyando and retired in 1974.

References

Members of the Queensland Legislative Assembly
1913 births
1982 deaths
20th-century Australian politicians